The 1953 World Table Tennis Championships were held at the Floreasca and Dynamo Halls in Bucharest from March 20 to March 29, 1953.

Medalists

Team

Individual

References

External links

ITTF Museum

 
World Table Tennis Championships
World Table Tennis Championships
World Table Tennis Championships
Table tennis competitions in Romania
International sports competitions hosted by Romania
March 1953 sports events in Europe
Sports competitions in Bucharest
1950s in Bucharest